Handapangoda is a town in Kalutara District, in the Western Province of Sri Lanka. It is on the road from Ingiriya to Colombo. It is located 45 km away from Colombo and 15 km away from Horana and 7 km from Ingiriya.
The town is administered by an Horana Pradeshiya Saba Council. Handapangoda is the sub-town of the Horana  election division as well as Ingiriya Sectoral Division. Dharmashoka  College is located close to the Handapangoda town. There is a stream or river, Mawak Ela, about 2.5 km away.

Main Cities near by the Handapanoda
 Ingiriya 7 KM away
 Horana 15.5 Km away
 Padukka 10 km away

Nearby settlements 

Listed below are some settlements close to Handapangoda:
Kurana (2.1 km)
Kotigala (2.1 km)
Arakawila (2.1 km)
Menerigama (2.1 km)
Kompe (2.5 km)
Batugampola (2.5 km)

General 
Handapangoda is situated in Western, Sri Lanka, its geographical coordinates are 6° 47' 35" North, 80° 8' 30" East.
Temperature: 31 °C / 87.8 °F
Wind: 9.2 km/h Northeast
Cloud: Broken at 1600 ft
The time zone in Handapangoda is Asia/Colombo
Sunrise at 06:48 and Sunset at 18:32. It's light
Latitude. 6.7930556°, Longitude. 80.1416667°

Airports close to Handapangoda 

Colombo ratmalana(RML), Colombo, Sri Lanka (50.4 km)
Bandaranaike international(CMB), Colombo, Sri Lanka (91.1 km)
Wirawila,  Sri Lanka (240 km)

Map of Handapangoda

Public Transport 

Bus routes of Handapangoda

125-Ingiriya-Maharagama,Colombo

316-Handapangoda- Horana

317/1-Handapangoda- Padukka (Menerigama Road)

120/316 Handapangoda-Colombo (via Horana)

317 - Horana - Madakada (via Ingiriya)

Temple 
Handapangoda Gane Viharaya

Public School of Handapangoda 

Handapangoda Navodya Maha Vidyalaya (Grade 6 to Grade 13)(Advance Level Art, Commerce)-Since 1894 ( Contract NO 034 2256332)

Sagara Palansuriya Maha Vidyalaya Handapangoda ( Grade 1 to 13)(Advance Level Art,Commerce)-Since 1954

Isipathana College -(Grade 1 to 5)-Primary School to Handapangoda Navodya Maha Vidyalaya

Menerigama Primary College (Grade 1 to 5) - primaray school to Handapangoda Navodya Maha Vidyalaya

Darmashoka College- (Grade 1 to 5)-Primary School to Handapangoda Navodya Maha Vidyalaya

Batugampola Junior College- (Grade 1-5)- (Sinhala & English Medium) Primary School to Sagara Palansuriya Maha Vidyalaya

Public Service 

People's Bank   Tel NO - 034-2256439

Sub Post office- Handapangoda ( Post Code 10524)  Tel No.

Sub post office - Batugampola ( Post Code 10526)

Sanasa Bank - Tel no 034-2256013

Grameeya Bankuwa

Filling station

Service Center

Public Library

Populated places in Sri Lanka